Columbia Pioneer Cemetery (also known as Columbia Masonic Cemetery) is an historic cemetery in Portland, Oregon's Parkrose neighborhood, in the United States. The cemetery was established in 1877, and acquired by Multnomah County in 1951.

References

External links
 
 
 

1877 establishments in Oregon
Cemeteries established in the 1870s
Cemeteries in Portland, Oregon
Parkrose, Portland, Oregon
Masonic cemeteries